A lure is an object used in falconry, usually made of leather with a pair of bird wings or feathers attached. It is often an effigy of a prey species or preferred quarry.  A falconer swings the lure round and round on a cord for the falcon to chase for exercise. There are at least three types of lure-flying. Short line, long line and pole luring. A lure also may be used as an object to call the falcon, hawk or eagle to return.

References

Falconry